Michael Louis Hearn (1866 – 1 May 1931) was an Irish Nationalist Member of the Parliament of the United Kingdom for South Dublin, 1917–18.

He was the son of T. Hearn of Dublin and was educated at Tullabeg College and at Ratcliffe College, Leicestershire, England. He was admitted as a solicitor in 1889, and built up an extensive practice, becoming President of the Incorporated Law Society. He was active in the Nationalist movement from early manhood, working on organization and electoral registration in South Dublin. He represented Rathmines for some years on Dublin County Council, of which he was chairman. He was also for some years chairman of the board of directors of the Nationalist newspaper, the Freeman's Journal.

Hearn was elected unopposed for South Dublin in a by-election on 6 July 1917, following the death of William Cotton. He did not stand at the general election the following year.

Notes

References

External links 
 
 

1866 births
1931 deaths
Members of the Parliament of the United Kingdom for County Dublin constituencies (1801–1922)
UK MPs 1910–1918
People educated at Ratcliffe College
People educated at St Stanislaus College
Councillors of Dublin County Council